Mbunda is a Bantu language of Angola and Zambia. There are several dialects: Katavola, Yauma, Nkangala, Mbalango, Sango, Ciyengele ("Shamuka"), and Ndundu, all of which are closely related. Mbunda was one of six languages selected by the Instituto de Línguas Nacionais (National Languages Institute) for an initial phase to establish spelling rules in 1980 to facilitate teaching in schools and promoting its use.

Sounds
Mbunda is similar to Luchazi, but has some differences in the consonants. Among other differences, where Luchazi has , Mbunda has . Where Luchazi has , Mbunda has dental .

Vowels
Like other languages in eastern Angola and Zambia, Mbunda language has five contrastive vowels:

Consonants
Voiced plosives only occur as prenasalized stops, where they contrast with aspirated plosives. Otherwise only tenuis plosives are found in Mbunda.

Orthography

Population
Mbunda is spoken by the Mbunda people of the Moxico Province and Cuando Cubango Province of Angola and western Zambia. upon the migration of among others, the Ciyengele,

Dialects
The Mbunda language in Zambia Angola is not spoken exactly the same way. In Zambia it has a strong upper teeth contact with the tongue, to pronounce words like: "Mundthzindthzime" (shadow), "chithzalo" (dress), "Kuthsa" (death) and many more. The difficult sounds represented by TH. Mbunda language in Angola and Namibia is spoken without the TH sounds, like in the Luchazi language; the words above are pronounced as "Mutzitzime" (shadow), "chizalo" (cloth), "Kutsa" (death). Even within Zambia, the Mbunda language spoken by the Chiyengele group that migrated earlier is different from that spoken by the Mbunda group that fled into Zambia as a consequence of the Mbunda-Portuguese war of 1914. That is why the Mbunda language of the Chiyengele group, mainly found in Mongu, is nicknamed "Shamuka", heavily influenced by Lozi language. The same term can be attributed to the Mbunda language in Namibia, which is heavily influenced by the Nyemba and Luchazi languages.

Numerals 
Numerical counting in Mbunda follows the usual numerals but in Mbunda words. Fill ups are easily made using small numerals.

1 - Chimo.

2 - Vivali.

3 - Vitatu.

4 - Viwana.

5 - Vitanu.

6 - Vitanu na chimo.

7 - Vitanu na vivali.

8 - Vitanu na vitatu.

9 - Vitanu na viwana.

10 - Likumi.

11 - Likumi na chimo.

20 - Makumi avali.

22 - Makumi avali na vivali.

30 - Makumi atatu.

33 - Makumi atatu na vitatu.

40 - Makumi awana.

44 - Makumi awana na viwana.

50 - Makumi atanu.

55 - Makumi atatu na vitanu.

60 - Makumi atanu na limo.

66 - Makumi atanu na limo na vitanu na chimo.

70 - Makumi atanu na avali.

77 - Makumi atanu na avali na vitanu na vivali.

80 - Makumi atanu na atatu.

88 - Makumi atanu na atatu na vitanu na vitatu.

90 - Makumi atanu na awana.

99 - Makumi atanu na awana na vitanu na viwana.

100 - Chiita.

101 - Chiita na kamo.

110 - Chiita na likumi.

111 - Chiita na likumi na kamo.

152 - Chiita na makumi atanu na tuvali.

163 - Chiita na makumi atanu na limo na tutanu.

174 - Chiita na makumi atanu na availi na tuwana.

185 - Chiita na makumi atanu na atatu na tutanu.

186 - Chiita na makumi atanu na atatu na tutanu na kamo.

197 - Chiita na makumi atanu na awana na tutanu na tuvali.

200 - Viita vivali.

201 - Viita vivali na kamo.

300 - Viita vitatu.

400 - Viita viwana.

500 - Viita vitanu.

600 - Viita vitanu na chimo.

700 - Viita vitanu na vivali.

800 - Viita vitanu na vitatu.

900 - Viita vitanu na viwana.

1,000 - Likulukathzi.

1,111 - Likulukathzi na chiita na likumi na kamo.

2,000 - Makulukathzi avali.

3,000 - Makulukathzi atatu.

4,000 - Makulukathzi awana.

5,000 - Makulukathzi atanu.

6,000 - Makulukathzi atanu na limo.

7,000 - Makulukathzi atanu na avali.

8,000 - Makulukathzi atanu na atatu.

9,000 - Makulukathzi atanu na awana.

10,000 - Likumi lya makulukathzi.

11,111 - likumi lya makulukathzi na likulukathzi na chiita na likumi na kamo.

20,000 - Makumi avali amakulukathzi.

30,000 - Makumi atatu amakulukathzi.

40,000 - Makumi awana amakulukathzi.

50,000 - Makumi atanu amakulukathzi.

60,000 - Makumi atanu na limo amakulukathzi.

70,000 - Makumi atanu na avali amakulukathzi.

80,000 - makumi atanu na atatu amakulukathzi.

90,000 - makumi atanu na awana amakulukathzi.

100,000 - chiita cha makulukathzi.

200,000 - viita vivali vya makulukathzi.

300,000 - viita vitatu vya makulukathzi.

400,000 - viita viwana vya makulukathzi.

500,000 - viita vitanu vya makulukathzi.

600,000 - viita vitanu na chimo vya makulikathzi.

700,000 - viita vitanu na vivali vya makulukathzi.

800,000 - viita vitanu na vitatu vya makulukathzi.

900,000 - viita vitanu na viwana vya makulukathzi.

1,000,000 - likulukathzi lya makulukathzi.

Names and meanings 
Mbunda names are many; listed are the ones commonly used. They can be given either to a male or female, except a very few that are for females only and have been indicated here by (f). Some Mbunda names are similar to those of other nationalities which also have their roots in the Luba Kingdom, such as Kaunda, Katongo, Kavanda, Mulenga, Muvanga, Mwila, Kavunda, Kalunga, Muti, Chiinga, Kavalata, Chiti, Nkonde and others. Also similar to Mbunda names are Chipoya, Chipango, Musole, Kayata, Ngambo, Kawengo, Kapisa and Musumali, found in other ethnic groups which trace their origins to Mwantiyavwa the king of the Ruund. These similarities give further evidence that Mbunda people interacted with the Kingdom of Lunda and Kingdom of Luba, in the 15th century. The commonly used Mbunda names are as follows:

1. Viemba (Vyemba) meaning medicines.

2. Vulungi meaning trekking to new settlement

3. Chendamundali meaning tourist, (vacendamundali-plural).

4. Chalula meaning someone who found (picked) a lost thing.

5. Chambato meaning a bridegroom.

6. Changoco meaning a useless person.

7. Changano meaning an "I don't care" person.

8. Chavaya meaning a destitute person.

9. Chikatu meaning source.

10. Chilala meaning cruelty.

11. Chiinga meaning substitute or substitution.

12. Chiingi meaning the substitute wife from same family as first wife.

13. Chilindo meaning the float of fish net.

14. Chilombo meaning a place where things are put to soak or dye.

15. Chilunda meaning the second born.

16. Chimbali meaning the slave of a white person.

17. Chimbinde meaning a cantankerous person, cruel.

18. Chindele meaning a white person.

19. Chindumba meaning a kind of hair plait.

20. Chingumbe meaning a strong and healthy man. Name of the 14th Mbunda King
who ruled Mbundaland in the 17th century in what is now Angola.

21. Chingunde meaning moroseness, sullenness.

22. Chingwali meaning a shackle for the head, a fetter.

23. Chinjenge meaning to be left in hardship.

24. Chinunga meaning an articulated joint.

25. Chinyundu meaning a beehive smoker (to rid the hive of bees).

26. Chioola meaning a quiet person; sober.

27. Chipango meaning the fence built for a woman giving birth.

28. Chipipa meaning to swish or whip through the air.

29. Chipoya meaning a machile or hammock.

30. Chiputa meaning a type of shrub; bush.

31. Chixwaxwa (Chishwashwa) meaning an empty light shell.

32. Chiti meaning wood or tree.

33. Chitumbo meaning a big heap of soil.

34. Chitundu meaning a type of plant with an edible tuber.

35. Chiyengele meaning a red cloth belt. Name of the Senior Mbunda Chief in Bulozi,
declared by King Mulena Mulambwa of the Aluyi people.

36. Chiyengo meaning big barrel.

37. Chuma meaning thing.

38. Kaalu meaning a surviving twin.

39. Kavavu meaning June.

40. Kafunya meaning a presumptuous person.

41. Kafuti meaning the child born after twins.

42. Kailu meaning the child born after five children's death, regarded as a "returned" person.

43. Kaliki meaning the chief's storehouse.

44. Kaliye meaning being lonely.

45. Kalimbwe (vulimbwe) meaning a person using birdlime to catch birds.

46. Kalumbu, for females, meaning a stray person who has lost her good character.

47. Kaliata (Kalyata) meaning a person who oppresses others.

48. Kaliangu (Kalyangu) meaning a kind of jester or masked dancer.

49. Kamana meaning a wise person.

50. Kanjengo meaning white cloth.

51. Kankondo meaning a kind of weasel that eats fowls.

52. Kanjonja meaning a type of gun; flintlock.

53. Kanunga meaning a small joint.

54. Kapatitho (Kapatiso) meaning bolt fastener.

55. Kapitha (Kapisa) meaning a person who refuses to help because he is miserly and stingy or who burns something.

56. Kaxweka (Kashweka) meaning a hidden thing.

57. Kaxukwe (Kashukwe) meaning August.

58. Kathoka (Kasoka) meaning a person who loads the gun; rams the charge into the gun.

59. Kathonda (Kasonda) (vuthampu - vusampu) meaning a kind of coiffure.

60. Katavola meaning a person who tears something apart. Name of the famous 20th Mbunda King who fought and defeated the Chokwe people in what is now Angola.

61. Katota meaning a person who knocks or hammers on something.

62. Katongo meaning a wanderer.

63. Kaulembi (kulamba) meaning a person who goes to appeal for help.

64. Kavindama meaning an unfortunate person.

65. Kavunda meaning a person who smears the concrete floor.

66. Kawengo meaning the spirit of a deceased woman.

67. Kayando meaning a sufferer, trouble.

68. Kayawe meaning a cunning person.

69. Kayongo meaning the spirit of a deceased man.

70. Kathzungo (Kazungo) meaning noise or racket. Name of the 22nd Mbunda King who was installed by the Portuguese colonialists, after abducting King Mwene Mbandu I Lyondthzi Kapova, the 21st Monarch of Mbundaland in what is now Angola.

71. Kufuna meaning to and fro. (Not Mbunda by origin but used today).

72. Kalunga meaning God.

73. Kuunga meaning to gather.

74. Kuvangu, see Kawengo.

75. Lifuti meaning country. Name of the 23rd Mbunda King and the first to be installed by the Mbunda people after the restoration of the Mbunda monarchy in what is now Angola, since the abduction of the 21st Mbunda King who resisted the Portuguese occupation of Mbundaland in 1914.

76. Likonge meaning a kind of water grass.

77. Liongo meaning a river reed.

78. Livindamo meaning an unlucky village or place.

79. Luvinda meaning hard luck or misfortune.

80. Liwoyo meaning racket, noise.

81. Lumbala is the name of a river in eastern Angola.

82. Liato (Lyato) meaning a big canoe.

83. Liunda (Lyunda) meaning grove.

84. Maamba meaning evil spirits possessing people.

85. Makayi meaning bracelets.

86. Makalu meaning a brave person.

87. Makuwa from (kulikuwa) meaning someone who shouts when rejoicing.

88. Maliti meaning a type of rifle, a single loader.

89. Manjolo meaning tubular anklets.

90. Manyenga meaning a worried person, also means to render fat.

91. Mathambo (Masambo) meaning small wires.

92. Matheka (Maseka), see Makayi.

93. Mathumba (Masumba) meaning crescent shaped medallions.

94. Mbaita (f) meaning please pass, to allow to pass.

95. Mbalili (f) meaning keg, barrel.

96. Mbambale meaning the spinning device used by Mbunda.

97. Mbandu meaning sore. Name of the 21st Mbunda King who resisted the Portuguese occupation of Mbundaland in 1914 in what is now Angola.

98. Mbundi (f) meaning a fetish stick.

99. Mukovoto meaning a talkative person.

100. Mukuve meaning a kind of tree for bark rope.

101. Mukwita meaning a passer-by; to pass by.

102. Mulenga meaning a piece of wood split off a tree struck by thunder and lightning.

103. Mulemba meaning a kind of tree that produces rubber.

104. Mulikita meaning great big-game hunter, also boxer.

105. Muliata (Mulyata), see Kaliata (Kalyata).

106. Mundanya, see Mathumba (Masumba).

107. Mundu (kaundu) meaning medicine rubbed on the body to make it impervious to bullets. Name of the first Mbunda Chief who migrated to Bulozi in the 16th century.

108. Mundthzimba meaning an ignorant person.

109. Mununga meaning a person who joins things together.

110. Muthando (Musando) meaning millet.

111. Muthangu (Musangu) meaning a resurrected person.

112. Muxova (Mushova) (f) meaning mixed things.

113. Muxuwa (Mushuwa) (f) meaning a tree with little leaves, see mulemba.

114. Muthompa (Musompa) meaning a judge.

115. Muti (chiti) meaning tree.

116. Muvanga meaning a kind of shrub; also means firstborn.

117. Muwae (f) meaning beauty.

118. Muyeva, see Katongo.

119. Muyenga meaning to render fat or beeswax.

120. Muyombo (muxaa - mushaa) meaning a type of fetish stick.

121. Mwila meaning grass.

122. Ndandula meaning he must follow.

123. Ndombelo meaning a young girl who pounds white maize into theke (seke) which is used in ritual offerings (nombelo) to ancestral spirits.

124. Ndumba meaning lion.

125. Ngeve meaning female twins.

126. Ngongola, see Katota.

127. Nguvu meaning male twins; also hippopotamus.

128. Njamba, meaning elder of the twins; also elephant.

129. Nkumbwa meaning ostrich.

130. Nyumbu meaning a type of swamp reed.

131. Nyundu meaning otter.

132. Thakulo (Sakulo) meaning a kind of grass used for thatching.

133. Theke (Seke) meaning white maize meal used for offerings to ancestral spirits.

134. Xanda (Shanda), meaning battle, honey badger. Name of the 22nd Mbunda King who was installed by the Portuguese colonialists, after abducting King Mwene Mbandu I Lyondthzi Kapova, the 21st Monarch of Mbundaland in what is now Angola.

135. Wacama, the abbreviation of (waca manene) meaning you like something very much.

136. Wampata meaning an argumentative or stubborn person.

See also
Mbunda Kingdom
Mbunda people

References

Literature
 Jacky Maniacky, 1997, "Contribution à l'étude des langues bantoues de la zone K: analyse comparative et sous-groupements", Mémoire pour l'obtention du DEA de langues, littératures et sociétés, études bantoues, INALCO (Paris - France), 101p.
 José Redinha, 1975, Etnias e Culturas de Angola, Luanda: Instituto de Investigação Científica de Angola; reprinted fac-simile by the Associação das Universidades de Língua Portuguesa, 2009, 

Populated places in Cuando Cubango Province
Populated places in Moxico Province
Municipalities of Angola
Chokwe-Luchazi languages
Languages of Angola
Languages of Zambia
Mbunda languages
Languages of Namibia